La Méprise (Marivaux) is a comedy in one act and in prose, written by French playwright Pierre de Marivaux and first performed on August 6, 1734, by the Comédie-Italienne at the théâtre of the Hôtel de Bourgogne.

Characters 
 Clarice
 Hortense, Clarice's sister
 Ergaste
 Lisette, Clarice's servant
 Arlequin, Hortense's servant
 Frontin, Ergaste's servant.

Plot 
Two sisters, both blonde and charming, dress the same. The play is set in a park, where the young ladies are having a walk, hiding their face behind a mask. Ergaste, the lover, thinks he is talking to one sister when in fact it is the other. quid pro quos follow, until the two sisters disappear together.

References

Bibliography 
  Lucette Desvignes, "Marivaux et La Méprise : exploration d’un thème antique", Revue de Littérature Comparée, n. 41, pp. 166–179, 1967.
  Jean Fleury, Marivaux et le marivaudage, Paris: Plon, 1881.

Plays by Pierre de Marivaux